Lumous Gothic Festival (more commonly known as Lumous) was the largest festival dedicated to the goth subculture in Finland and the northernmost Gothic festival in the world. The four-day event was organised every summer in Tampere in late June or early July. While its primary focus was on music, covering musical genres such as gothic rock, deathrock, industrial, EBM and neofolk, other cultural and arts events were also organised as part of the festival. Lumous Festival consisted mainly of club nights organised in bars and clubs at the centre of Tampere, and also included a cruise dubbed die dunkle Seereise on the lake Pyhäjärvi.

Lumous was organised yearly by Lumous Gothic Ry, and its history dates back to 2001 when a handful of Tampere club nights decided to join forces and organise a three-day event called Extreme Gothic Weekend with performances from Two Witches, Nik, The Candles Burning Blue and Viola. Since then, the name of the event was changed in 2002 to the current Lumous Gothic Festival, the festival gained popularity within Finland and beyond, and also expanded to a four-day event. Previous years have seen international acts such as Zombina and the Skeletones, Das Ich, Haujobb, Pro-jekt and Killing Miranda play at Lumous, along with local bands such as Two Witches, Masquerade, Virgin in Veil and Suruaika.

Program by year

2001 Lumous Gothic Festival I (originally known as Extreme Gothic Weekend) 
Bands: Two Witches (FI), The Candles Burning Blue (FI), Viola (FI), Niklas Carlsson of Dark Side Cowboys (SE)

2002 Lumous Gothic Festival II
Bands: Ordo Rosarius Equilibrio (SE), No Festival Of Neither Light Order Roses Nor Equilibrium (SE), Tabloid (SE), Suruaika (FI), The Candles Burning Blue (FI), A.Z.O.I.C. (FI), J. Witch & M. Hautamäki Acoustic (FI)

Special guest DJ: Frey (FI)

2003 Lumous Gothic Festival III
Bands: Sepulcrum Mentis (DE), Varjo (FI), Imaginary Walls (SE), Martin Kasprzak & Marko Hautamäki
(DE/FI), The Cyan Velvet Project (FI), UltraNoir (FI), Nyx (FI), Gravehill (FI)

2004 Lumous Gothic Festival IV
Bands: Killing Miranda (UK), Coph Nia (SE), Haujobb (DE), VJ Fetish 23 (SE), Suruaika (FI), Machine Park (FI), Scarecrow (FI)

2005 Lumous Gothic Festival V
Bands: Angels & Agony (NL), Midnight Configuration (UK), Two Witches (FI), The Protagonist (SE), Pro-jekt (UK), Neon Zoo (UK), Angelica Kult (FI), Mesmer (FI), The Mimic (FI)

2006 Lumous Gothic Festival VI
Bands: Zombina & The Skeletones (UK), Inertia (UK), Raison d'Etre (SE), Libitina (UK), Doppelgänger (RU), Suruaika (FI), Silene (FI), UltraNoir (FI), Nevernettles (FI)

2007 Lumous Gothic Festival VII
Bands: Das Ich (DE), All Gone Dead (UK), Venus Fly Trap (UK), KnifeLadder (UK), Suicidal Romance (EE), Suruaika (FI), SinMasters (FI), Machine Park (FI), 80th Disorder (FI), Varjopiiri (FI)

Special guest DJ: Trevize (FI)

Lecture: Sofi Oksanen (FI)

2008 Lumous Gothic Festival VIII
Bands: Psyche (CA/DE), Kirlian Camera (IT), Star Industry (BE), The Last Days of Jesus (SK), Desiderii Marginis (SE), Voices of Masada (UK), Forgotten Sunrise (EE), Novus (UK), Beati Mortui (FI), Curtain Call (FI)

Documentary: Vuoden Synkin Juhla (About Finnish Goth scene)

2009 Lumous Gothic Festival IX
Bands: Project Pitchfork (DE), Inkubus Sukkubus (UK), Vendemmian (UK), Deviant UK (UK), Patenbrigade:Wolff (DE), Golden Apes (DE), Trümmerfrau (DE), Grunt (FI), Silene (FI), Murnau's Playhouse (FI), Silent Scream (FI), The Mimic (FI)], -Sihil (FI)

Lecture: Timo Vuorensola (FI)

2010 Lumous Gothic Festival X
Bands: Leæther Strip (DK), XP8 (IT), Nosferatu (UK), Two Witches (FI/DE), Deutsch Nepal (SE), The Cemetary Girlz (FR), Waves Under Water (SE), Grooving In Green (UK), Silene (FI), Chaos Research (FI), Kuroshio (FI), Haeretici 7074 (FI), Maria (FI)

Documentary: Vuoden Synkin Juhla (About Finnish Goth scene)

2011 Lumous Gothic Festival XI
Bands: Klutæ (DK), Star Industry (BE), Anne-Marie Hurst Skeletal Family (UK), Attrition (UK), Freakangel (EE), Larva (ES), Lloyd James & Edel Braun (UK), Silent Scream (FI), UltraNoir (FI), Wreckdance (FI), -Sihil (FI), Loistava Polku (FI), Impakt! (FI), Depressed Blokes (FI), Single Sound (FI)

Special guest DJ: [M4RC] (NL)

2012 Lumous Gothic Festival XII
Bands: Extinction Front (ES), Soviet Soviet (IT), The Last Days of Jesus (SK), Chaos All Stars (SE), Bloodygrave & Die Lust! (DE), Emplosia (RU), Jemek Jemowit (DE), Psyyke (FI), Oldschool Union (FI), Impakt! (FI), Harmony Garden (FI), Whrmcht (FI)

Special guest DJ: Meke (FI)

2013 Lumous Gothic Festival XIII
Bands: Spiritual Front (IT), Cryo (SE), Dark Side Cowboys (SE), Darkrad (RU), Silent Scream -acoustic special (FI), Erila-Z (FI), Ovro (FI), Loistava Polku (FI), Masquerade (FI), Wreckdance (FI), Protectorate (FI)

Special guest DJ: K-109 (FI)

2014 Lumous Gothic Festival XIV
Bands: Leæther Strip (DK), Ordo Rosarius Equilibrio (SE), Two Witches (FI/DE), Malaise (SE), Autogen (LV), Psyyke (FI), Chaos Research (FI), Blastromen (FI), Unzyme (FI), The Flatfield (FI), Juha Raution Duo Perikato (FI), J.K.Ihalainen (FI)

Special guest DJ: Nik Carlsson (SE), Kari Berg (SE)

Special storyteller gig: Antti Lautala (FI) & Matthew Pallasoja (FI)

2015 Lumous Gothic Festival XV
Bands: Das Ich (DE), Red Sun Revival (UK), Los Carniceros Del Norte (ES), Golden Apes (DE), Sleetgrout feat. Zynthexia (RU), Forgotten Sunrise (EE), Afghan Dance (DE/FI), Silene (FI), Wreckdance(FI), Harmony Garden (FI), The Flatfield (FI), Bodykomplex (FI)

Special storyteller gig: J. Witch & M. Hautamäki & Toby (FI)

Special guest DJ: Jaakko (FI), 4-Got-10 (EE)

Lecture: Trestalkers (FI)

Documentary: Industrial Soundtrack For the Urban Decay

2016 Lumous Gothic Festival XVI
Bands: Aesthetic Perfection (US),  SHIV-R (AU), Two Witches (FI), Canis Lupus (SE), Naevus - Solo (UK), Blastromen (FI), Chaos Research (FI), Masquerade (FI), Unzyme (FI), Cardinal Noire (FI), Virgin In Veil (FI), Sortaja (FI), Submission (FI)

Special guest DJ: Shades (FI), Slackerbitch (SE)

Special storyteller gig: Advanced Art (FI)

2017 Lumous Gothic Festival XVII
Bands: Nachtmahr (AT), Spiritual Front (IT), Double Echo (UK), Thinner (LV), Severance (MX), Giant Waves (RU), Nemuer (CZ), The Flatfield (FI), Many Happy Returns (FI), Hexdrive (FI), Bodykomplex (FI), Miseria Ultima (FI), Aus Tears (FI)

Special guest DJ: Shades (FI)

2018 Lumous Gothic Festival XVIII
Bands: Terrolokaust (ES), Metallspürhunde (CH), Randolph's Grin (US/AT), The Doctors (FR), Auger (UK), Novus (UK), Agnosia (FI), Astral Zombie (FI), Chaos Research (FI), Hateful Chains (FI), Riot Kitten (FI), Sekret Teknik (FI)

Special guest DJ: Niklas Carsson (SE), Jussi40 (FI)

Poetry performance: Artemis Kelosaari (FI)

Lecture: Eero Ojanen (FI)

2019 Lumous Gothic Festival XIX
Bands: Das Ich (DE), The Danse Society (UK), Inertia (UK), Golden Apes (DE), Black Volition (UK), Blood Magick (SE), My Own Burial (ES), Raven Said (RU), Tyburn Blossom (IE), Aeronaut V (FI), Murnau's Playhouse (FI), Plastic Bitch (FI), UltraNoir (FI), Virgin In Veil (FI)

Special guest DJ: NightOwl (SE)

Lecture: Asko Alanen (FI)

2020 Lumous Gothic Festival XX – The Final Episode
Bands: Two Witches (FI), Oldschool Union (FI), Chaos Research (FI), Sekret Teknik (FI)

See also
List of gothic festivals
List of industrial music festivals
List of electronic music festivals

References

External links
Lumous Gothic Festival

Music festivals established in 2001
Rock festivals in Finland
Tampere
Goth festivals
Electronic music festivals in Finland
Industrial music festivals